Skazi is an Israeli EDM DJ  formed in 1998, by Asher Swissa.

History
Skazi was formed in 1998 by Asher Swissa and Assaf Bivas, producing Soft Psy-Trance Electro Punk music.

Swissa began his musical career as a punk rocker in 1990, when he formed a group called Sartan Hashad (en. Breast Cancer) together with three friends. The band played in small venues in Jerusalem and Tel Aviv, and enjoyed limited success in the Israeli punk scene. In 1996 Asher left the band to develop his career and to write and perform music which would appeal to larger audiences. He started making trance music, but still kept a hard rock sound, playing electric guitar riffs in many of his tracks. In 1998 he adopted the stage name DJ Skazi. Swissa is also a former member of WARRIORS, a musical group in collaboration with DJ MR.BLACK and which published one EP, Who's Afraid of 138!?, with Armada Music. In more recent years, Skazi is at times referred to with his real name, Asher Swissa, often stylised as ASHER SWISSA.

Recording career
Skazi's first album, Animal, was released in September 2000. On this album Skazi combined live guitar riffs and techy hardcore sounds. While the music meshed with other Psy-Trance, it shared elements of Hard House and Techno record label, Chemical Crew.

Skazi produced four compilations between the years 2001 and 2004 (Zoo1, Zoo2, Zoo3 and Most Wanted). Skazi has also been involved in collaborations with other artists.

Discography

Animal (Shaffel Records, 2001)
Zoo 1 (2001)
Storm (Shaffel Records, 2002)
Most Wanted (2003)
Zoo 2 (2003)
Zoo 3 (2004)
Animal in Storm (Special Edition - Double CD, 2004) 
Total Anarchy (2006)
Promo 2008 (2009)
My Way (2012)
Spin (2015)
Faded (with Nervo (2019)

References

Israeli psychedelic trance musicians
Israeli electronic music groups
Trance music groups